Jerzy Twarowski (born December 19, 1995 in Kraków) is a Polish swimmer specializing in butterfly.  Twarowski is a member of University of Iowa Swimming and Diving team in the United States. Prior to college, he represented Jordan Kraków.  Twarowski is a multiple Polish junior champion from the age of 13 and a member of the Polish junior national team in swimming.

He has qualified and competed at the NCAA Division I Swimming and Diving Championships in both his freshman and sophomore years. Jerzy is coached by Marc Long.

In 2013 he won gold medals on Polish junior championships for 100 m butterfly and 200 m butterfly.

Twarowski won a bronze medal with a mixed relay 4x100 m medley (Agata Naskret, Marcin Stolarski, Jerzy Twarowski, Wioletta Orczykowska; 3:54.30) during 2013 European Junior Swimming Championships in Poznan. Twarowski also won two bronze medals during 2011 European Youth Summer Olympic Festival in Trabzon, Turkey (200 m butterfly; 2:02.73 and in relay 4×100m medley; 3:51.02).

References

Living people
1995 births
Polish male butterfly swimmers
Sportspeople from Kraków
21st-century Polish people